White Heat is the twelfth studio album recorded by singer Dusty Springfield, and eleventh released. It was only released in the United States and Canada.

More so than her previous two albums, It Begins Again (1978), and Living Without Your Love (1979), and the non-album single "It Goes Like It Goes" (1980), White Heat was a distinct departure from Springfield's Los Angeles-produced radio-friendly soft rock sound, being closely identified with the new wave, synthpop sounds of the early 1980s. The album arguably contains the most diverse selection of genres to be collected on any Dusty Springfield studio album, ranging from Robbie Buchanan's ballad "Time and Time Again", orchestrated by James Newton Howard, to the aggressive hard rock of "Blind Sheep", co-written by Springfield herself. The sessions for "Blind Sheep" are the last designated sessions for Twentieth Century Fox Records in the Musician's Guild Logs.

The album's opening track and only single release was "Donnez-Moi (Give It to Me)" which production wise took more than a few hints from contemporaneous synthesizer-driven pop productions by Giorgio Moroder, like Donna Summer's The Wanderer and Irene Cara's "Flashdance... What a Feeling", and British New Romantic bands like the Human League and their 1981 album Dare.

Background and recording
Jean-Alain Roussel lived in Montreal at the time. Springfield lived part-time in Toronto at this stage in her life; the two met through mutual friends and ended up collaborating on most of White Heat.

Written by Canadian New Wave band Rough Trade's Carole Pope and Kevan Staples, "Soft Core" describes the realities of a dysfunctional relationship. "Soft Core" was cut in a single take by sheer mistake, thanks to an engineer throwing a tape machine into 'record', with composer Kevan Staples playing a grand piano. The sound of footsteps heard at the beginning of the track is, in fact, Springfield walking up to the piano for what she thought was just a rehearsal.

Release
In the aftermath of the disco backlash and its ensuing dramatic drop in record sales worldwide, Springfield's American label United Artists Records was bought out. 20th Century Fox Records took on the project, but by the time that the album was completed and ready for release, 20th Century Fox had in turn been sold, bought by the US arm of the PolyGram conglomerate. The release date was postponed for another six months and when White Heat finally came out, it had been relegated to the re-activated Casablanca Records, a label closely associated with disco, which in the year of 1982 didn't improve its chances of sales. Springfield later stated that she was surprised that the album came out at all: "Every time I made an album, the company I'd made it for would be swallowed up. They'd fire everyone that you'd worked with and the enthusiasm would disappear with them. Then I had to fire the original producer because he had put half the budget up his nose... there was a point where I began to feel that I was just some company's tax loss."

The British subsidiary of Polygram, a label the singer had been connected with for 25 years in various forms, declined its option to release the album in the UK; fans of Springfield's in her native country consequently had to buy import copies from the US and Canada.

White Heat in its entirety was first issued in the UK in 2002 when it was released on CD by Mercury/Universal Music.

Reception

Reviewing the album in Record, Barry Alfonso commented, "Springfield's now stepped away from her earlier MOR approach and headed in a Grace Jones pop/funk direction. The results are uneven, but encouraging nonetheless." He elaborated that Springfield's sensual approach to songs like "I Am Curious" and "I Don't Think We Could Ever Be Friends" was perfect, while she mishandled ballads such as "Losing You" by taking a modern approach to them instead of the emotional thrust that was her trademark sound.

Track listing
Side A
"Donnez Moi (Give It to Me)"  (Jean-Alain Roussel, Paul Northfield, Luc Plamondon, Christiane Robichaud) – 3:52
"I Don't Think We Could Ever Be Friends"  (Jean-Alain Roussel, Sting) – 3:25
"Blind Sheep" (Daniel Ironstone, Tommy Faragher, Dusty Springfield, Mary Unobsky) – 4:28
"Don't Call It Love"  (Dean Pitchford, Tom Snow) – 3:28
"Time and Time Again" (Paul Buchanan, Jay Gruska) – 3:40

Side B
"I Am Curious"  (Carole Pope, Kevan Staples) – 4:06
"Sooner or Later"  (Tommy Faragher, Daniel Ironstone) – 4:18
"Losing You (Just a Memory)"  (Elvis Costello) – 2:48
"Gotta Get Used to You"  (Jean-Alain Roussel) – 3:53
"Soft Core"  (Carole Pope, Kevan Staples) – 3:13

Personnel
 Dusty Springfield – lead vocals, background vocals
 Max Gronenthal – background vocals
 Eddy Keating – background vocals
 John Townsend – background vocals
 Danny Ironstone – background vocals
 Barbara Busa Cilla – background vocals
 George Nauful – guitar
 David Plehn – guitar
 Jean Roussel – synthesizer, piano
 Robbie Buchanan – piano, Fender Rhodes electric piano
 Tommy Faragher – synthesizer, percussion, background vocals, Wurlitzer electric piano, Casio
 Nicky Hopkins – piano
 James Newton Howard – Prophet-5 synthesizer, string arrangements
 Caleb Quaye – synthesizer, bass, guitar, Wurlitzer electric piano, Minimoog
 Kevan Staples – piano, guitar, Minimoog
 Steve Sykes – guitar, Wurlitzer electric piano, Minimoog
 Nathan East – bass guitar
 Davey Faragher – bass
 Marlo Henderson – bass
 Mark Leonard – bass
 Kenny Lee Lewis – bass
 André Fischer – drums
 Gary Mallaber - drums "Blind Sheep"
 Casey Scheuerell – drums
 Linn Drums - drums
 Steve Zaretsky – percussion

Production
 Dusty Springfield – record producer
 Howard Steele – producer, engineer, mixing
 André Fischer – producer
 Jackie Krost – executive producer
 Steve Zaretsky – assistant engineer
 Lindy Griffin – assistant engineer
 Philip Moores – assistant engineer
 Nick DeCaro – arranger, conductor
 Karen Chamberlain – assistant engineer
 Les D. Cooper – assistant engineer
 Debra Courier – production assistant
 Glen Christensen – art direction
 Bret Lopez – photography
 Mac James – paintings

Sources

 Howes, Paul (2001). The Complete Dusty Springfield. London: Reynolds & Hearn Ltd. .
 O'Brien, Lucy (1988, 2000): Dusty. London: Pan Books Ltd. .
 Official site Jean-Alain Roussel

Dusty Springfield albums
1982 albums
Casablanca Records albums